The Duesenberg Straight-8 engine was produced from 1921 to 1937 and sold in Duesenberg automobiles. Fred and August Duesenberg got their start building experimental racing engines which achieved a great deal of success. Among their accomplishments are wins at the Indianapolis 500, the 1921 French Grand Prix and speed records at the Bonneville Salt Flats. They used the expertise they had gained to start building production engines and cars which were renowned for their performance and luxury.

Among the novel design features (for a pre-1940 production engine) seen on various Duesenberg engines are single- and double-overhead camshafts, three- and four-valve heads, superchargers and aluminum castings.

Production engines

Competition engines
The engines listed below were designed by Duesenberg for the Indianapolis 500.  Some engines of the 122 CID and 91 CID design were bored/stroked to larger displacements for other races classes, after the 1930 rules change at Indianapolis.

See also
 Duesenberg
 Multivalve
 OHC
 Overhead valve
 Straight-8
 Lycoming Engines

Notes

References

External links
 Grand Prix Car
 Model A
 Model X
 Model J

Straight-8|OHC|Multivalve
Automobile engines

Straight-eight engines